This is a list of the colleges and institutes in Madurai district.

Madurai has been an academic centre of learning of Tamil culture, literature, art, music and dance for centuries. All three assemblies of the Tamil language, the Tamil Sangam (about the 3rd century BC to the 3rd century CE), were held at Madurai. The American College in Madurai is the oldest college in the city and second oldest college in Tamil Nadu, established in 1881 by American Christian missionaries. The Lady Doak college, established in 1948, is the oldest women's college in Madurai. The Madura College (established in 1889), Fatima College (established in 1953) and M.S.S. Wakf Board College (established in 1964) are among the oldest educational institutions of the city. Vivekananda College, Tiruvedakam West, established in 1971, is the only residential college run in the gurukula pattern of education. Madurai Kamaraj University (originally called Madurai University), established in 1966, is the state run university that has 109 affiliated arts and science colleges in Madurai and neighbouring districts. There are 47 approved institutions of the university in and around the city consisting of autonomous colleges, aided colleges, self-financing colleges, constituent colleges, evening colleges and other approved institutions. There are seven polytechnics and five industrial training institutes in Madurai, with the Government Industrial Training Institute and the Government Polytechnic for Women being the most prominent. Fire and Safety Training Provided by Ideal industrial Training Institute Located in Krihsnapuram colony,  The government institutes, namely, the Madurai Medical College and the Homoeopathic Medical College, along with the 11 paramedical institutes constitute the medical and paramedical paradigm of Madurai. There are seven engineering colleges in Madurai affiliated to Anna University, with the Thiagarajar College of Engineering being the oldest of all. The Madurai Law College, established in 1979, is one of the seven government law colleges in the state, administered by the Tamil Nadu Government Department of Legal Studies, and affiliated to the Tamil Nadu Dr. Ambedkar Law University. There are three teacher training institutes, two music colleges, three management institutes and 30 Arts & Science colleges in Madurai. The agricultural college and research institute in Madurai, started in 1965, by the state government provides agricultural education to aspirants in the southern districts of Tamil Nadu. There are a total of 369 primary, secondary and higher secondary schools in the city.

Medical colleges
Madurai Medical College
 Homoeopathic Medical College, Madurai
 Meenakshi Mission Hospital & Research Centre
 CSI Jeyaraj Annapackiam College of Nursing, Pasumalai
 CSI College of Dental Sciences and Research, East Veli Street
 Vadamalayan Institute Of Medical And Allied Health Sciences, Chinna Chokikulam
 Velammal Medical College and Hospital
 Preethi Institute of Medical Sciences & Research (PIMS)
 Preethi Paramedical Institute
 Lakshmana Paramedical Institute

Engineering colleges
Thiagarajar College of Engineering
 Central Institute of Plastics Engineering & Technology (CIPET), Madurai
K. L. N. College of Engineering
Solamalai College of Engineering / Raja College of Engineering and Technology
SACS MAVMM Engineering College
Velammal College of Engineering and Technology
ST.Michael College of Engineering and Technology
PTR College of Engineering
Vickram College of Engineering
Vaigai College of Engineering
Latha Mathavan Engineering College
Ultra College of Engineering 
Fatima Michael College of Engineering and Technology
Mangayarkarasi College of Engineering and Technology

Arts and Science Colleges
Auxilium Arts and Science College for Women, Chittampatti, Madurai
Thiagarajar College
Lady Doak College
Arul Anandar College, Karumathur
E.M.G. Yadava Women's College
M.S.S.Wakf Board College
Nadar Mahajana Sangam S. Vellaichamy Nadar College, Nagamalai 
The American College in Madurai
The Madura College
Ambiga College of Arts and Science for Women, Madurai
Yadava College Autonomous, Thirupalai
PKN Arts and Science College, Thirumangalam
Vivekananda College, Madurai
Ultra Arts and Science College, Othakadai
Nagarathinam Angalammal Arts and Science College, Perungudi
Saraswati Narayanan Arts and Science College, Perungudi
Senthamarai Arts and Science College, Vadapalnji
Lathamathavan Arts and Science College, Kidaripatti
KLN Arts and Science College, Pottapalayam
Pasumpon Muthuramalinga Thevar College, Usilampatti
Madurai Kamaraj University Evening College, Tallakulam 
Madurai Institute of Social Sciences
Sourashtra College, Pasumalai

Polytechnics and catering colleges
Government Polytechnic for Women
Tamil Nadu Polytechnic College
Government Polytechnic College, Chekkanurani
Leela Institute of Hotel Management and catering
Gesto Hotel management college
Alffa Catering College

ITI colleges
Tamil Nadu Government ITI, Pudhur
Tamil Nadu Women ITI, Pudhur
Tamil Nadu Government ITI, Chekkanoorni 
Loyola Private ITI, GnanaOlivuPuram
Kazi Tajuddin ITI, Kazimar Street
Ideal ITI, Krishnapuram Colony
CSI ITI, Pasumalai 
Uypa ITI, Thirunagar
Venkateshwara ITI, Thanakkankulam
Gms Gavmm Alagar Kovli 2019To2022←Set→ Nanga Tha Gethu Alagar Kovli Nanga Tha———

Schools 
Pasumalai CSI Boys Higher secondary school
Muthuthevar Mukkalathor Higher Secondary School, Thirunagar
Sethupati Higher Secondary School
Madura College Higher Secondary School
Savithabhai Higher Secondary School
Government Higher Secondary School, Thiruparankundram
Seethalaksmi Girls Higher Secondary School
Indira Gandhi Memorial Matriculation Higher Secondary School
C. S. Ramachary Memorial Matriculation Higher Secondary School
Nirmala Girls Higher Secondary School
Union Christian Higher Secondary School
American College Higher Secondary School
Thiagarajar Higher Secondary School, Andalpuram
Thiagaraja Model Higher Secondary School, Teppakulam
Mangayarkarasi Higher Secondary School
Ambika Matriculation School
Saracens Matriculation Higher secondary school
T.V.S. Matriculation Higher Secondary School
T. V. Sundaram Higher Secondary School
Maharishi Vidhyaa Mandir CBSE School, Kovilpapakudi
Maharishi Vidhyaa Mandhir CBSE School, Thanakkankulam 
Secondary Sc

hool 
St. Joseph's Girls Higher Secondary School, Chinthamani
St. Mary's Boys Higher Secondary School, Chinthamani
St. Britto Boys Higher Secondary School
Holy Family Girls Higher Secondary School
Capron Hall Girls Higher Secondary School
V.H.N. Higher Secondary School, Chinthamani
CEOA Matriculation Higher Secondary School
CEOA CBSE School
Dolphin CBSE School
Arbindo Mira Intranational School
Queen Mira Intranational School
Delhi World Public School
Sourashtra Boys Higher Secondary School
Sourashtra Girls Higher Secondary School
V.M.J ICSE School, Chinthamani
Kendriya Vidyalaya, Narimedu
Lakshmi School, Karuppayoorani
M.N.U.Jayaraj Nadar Higher Secondary School, Nagamalai Pudhukottai
Mahatma Montessori Matriculation Higher Secondary School
Sri Vidhyalayam Matriculation Higher Secondary School
Nadar Higher Secondary School
S.B.O.A. Matriculation Hr. Sec. School
Le Chatelier Matriculation Higher Secondary School
Crown Matriculation Higher Secondary School, Goripalayam
Sethurajan Matriculaction Higher Secondary School, Madurai
kendriya vidyalaya, Thirupparankundram
S.P.J Matriculation School

References

Education in Madurai district
Madurai